Illinois Route 82 (IL 82) is a rural north–south state highway in west central Illinois. It currently runs from Illinois Route 17 in Nekoma north to Illinois Route 92 near Joslin.

Route description 
Illinois 82 is an undivided, two-lane surface street for its entire length. It crosses the Edwards River, Interstate 80 (I-80), U.S. Route 6 (US 6), the Hennepin Canal and the Green River along its route. It also overlaps Illinois Route 81 in Cambridge.

History 

SBI Route 82 was existing Illinois 82, extended to Illinois Route 40 via Illinois 92 and Illinois Route 172. This ended in the 1930s.

Major intersections

References

External links

082
1924 establishments in Illinois
Transportation in Henry County, Illinois